Alexandra Yeung (born 15 September 1972) is a Hong Kong cyclist. She competed in the women's cross-country mountain biking event at the 2000 Summer Olympics.

References

External links
 

1972 births
Living people
Hong Kong female cyclists
Olympic cyclists of Hong Kong
Cyclists at the 2000 Summer Olympics
Place of birth missing (living people)
Cyclists at the 1998 Asian Games
Cyclists at the 2002 Asian Games
Asian Games competitors for Hong Kong